Sir Andrew Agnew, 3rd Baronet (died 1702) was the son of Sir Andrew Agnew, 2nd Baronet and Lady Anne Stewart.

Succession
He succeeded his father as 3rd Baronet Agnew, of Lochnaw on the latter's death in 1671. On his death in 1702 he was succeeded in the baronetcy by his third son, his elder sons having predeceased him.

Career
He was member of parliament for Wigtownshire in 1685 and 1689–1702.

Family
He married Jane Hay, daughter of Thomas Hay and Jean Hamilton (24 October 1656), and had issue:
Andrew Agnew
Thomas Agnew (d.16902)
Grizel Agnew, married Sir Charles Hay, 2nd Baronet (1685)
Sir James Agnew, 4th Baronet (c1660-1735)

External links
ThePeerage.com

1702 deaths
Baronets in the Baronetage of Nova Scotia
Shire Commissioners to the Parliament of Scotland
Members of the Parliament of Scotland 1685–1686
Members of the Convention of the Estates of Scotland 1689
Members of the Parliament of Scotland 1689–1702
Andrew
Year of birth missing